Ernstroda is a former municipality in the district of Gotha, in Thuringia, Germany. Since 1 December 2007, it is part of the town Friedrichroda.

See also
Reinhardsbrunn

Former municipalities in Thuringia